WordPad is the basic word processor that has been included with almost all versions of Microsoft Windows from Windows 95 onwards. It is more advanced than Windows Notepad, and simpler than Microsoft Word and Microsoft Works (last updated in 2007). WordPad replaced Microsoft Write.

Features

WordPad can format and print text, including font and bold, italic, colored, and centered text, and lacks functions such as a spell checker, thesaurus, and control of pagination. It does not support footnotes and endnotes. WordPad can read, render, and save many Rich Text Format (RTF) features that it cannot create, such as tables, strikeout, superscript, subscript, "extra" colors, text background colors, numbered lists, right and left indentation, quasi-hypertext and URL linking, and line-spacing greater than 1. It is simpler and faster than a richly-featured word processor, with low system resource use. Pasting into WordPad from an HTML document, such as a Web page or email, typically automatically converts most or all of it to RTF, depending partly on the Web browser from which the text is copied. WordPad is suited to taking notes; writing letters and stories; and use on various tablets, PCs, and smart phones. It is unsuitable for work that relies heavily on graphics and typesetting, such as most publishing-industry requirements for rendering final hard copy.

WordPad does not support all the features defined in the RTF/Word 2007 specification. Earlier versions of WordPad also supported the "Word for Windows 6.0" format, which is forward compatible with the Microsoft Word format.

In Windows 95, 98, and 2000, WordPad uses Microsoft's RichEdit control, versions 1.0, 2.0, and 3.0, respectively. In Windows XP SP1 and later, and Windows 7, it uses RichEdit 4.1.

A similar word processor, also called WordPad and with simple functionality, is supplied by some vendors on a Windows CE pre-installation. Its icon resembles an early Microsoft Word icon.

History

WordPad was introduced in Windows 95, replacing Microsoft Write, included with all previous versions of Windows (version 3.11 and earlier). The source code to WordPad was also distributed by Microsoft as a Microsoft Foundation Class Library sample application with MFC 3.2 and later, shortly before the release of Windows 95. It is still available for download from the MSDN website.

The default font used in Windows 95 to Windows Vista was 10pt Arial; in Windows 7 it was changed to 11pt Calibri.

WordPad for Windows XP added full Unicode support, enabling WordPad to support multiple languages, but big endian UTF-16/UCS-2 is not supported. It can open Microsoft Word (versions 6.0–2003) files, although it opens newer versions of the .doc format with incorrect formatting. Also, unlike previous WordPad versions, it cannot save files in the .doc format (only .txt, .odt, and .rtf). Files saved as Unicode text are encoded as UTF-16 LE. As a security measure Windows XP Service Pack 2 and later versions of Windows and its service packs reduced support for opening .WRI.

Windows 10 and later versions support voice typing. Windows XP Tablet PC Edition SP2 and Windows Vista include speech recognition, allowing dictation into WordPad. These and later Windows versions implement the RichEdit control, allowing WordPad to support extensible third-party services built using the Text Services Framework (TSF), such as grammar and spellcheck.

In Windows Vista support for reading Microsoft Word DOC files was removed because of the incorrect rendering and formatting problems, and because a Microsoft security bulletin reported a security vulnerability in opening Word files in WordPad. For viewing older (Word 97–2003), and Office Open XML, documents, Microsoft recommends free-of-charge Microsoft Word Viewer. Native Office Open XML and ODF 1.1 support was implemented in the Windows 7 version of WordPad.

In Windows 7 the program's user interface was updated to use a ribbon, similar to those in Microsoft Office.

In a 2020 insider build of Windows 10, WordPad is modified to include advertising notifications for the Office web apps as an alternative.

See also
 Jarte – a word processor based on the WordPad engine
 List of word processors
 Comparison of word processors

References

1995 software
Windows components
Windows word processors